Harvey James Bunker (born 15 April 2003) is an English professional footballer who plays as a midfielder for Scunthorpe United on loan from Forest Green Rovers.

Career
On 12 November 2019, Bunker made his debut for Forest Green Rovers in a 6–0 EFL Trophy defeat against Walsall. On 12 February 2022, he signed for National League side Weymouth on a one-month loan deal, with the side struggling in the relegation zone. 

In January 2022, Bunker signed a new contract that would keep him at the club until the end of the 2022–23 season. On 6 September 2022, he made his league debut as a substitute in a 2–1 League One victory over Accrington Stanley. On 25 October, Bunker scored a first senior goal for Forest Green when he opened the scoring in an eventual 1–1 draw with Fleetwood Town. In February 2023, he signed for National League club Scunthorpe United on loan until the end of the season with a view to getting more first-team minutes.

Career statistics

References

2003 births
Living people
Association football midfielders
English footballers
Forest Green Rovers F.C. players
Chippenham Town F.C. players
Weymouth F.C. players
Scunthorpe United F.C. players
National League (English football) players
English Football League players